The Royal Family Order of Elizabeth II is an honour that was bestowed on female members of the British royal family by Queen Elizabeth II. The order is worn on formal occasions.

Appearance
The Royal Family Order depicts a young Queen Elizabeth II in evening dress wearing the ribbon and star of the Order of the Garter. The miniature, painted on ivory (glass since 2017), is bordered by diamonds and surmounted by a Tudor Crown in diamonds and red enamel. The reverse, in silver-gilt, is patterned with rays and depicts the royal cypher and St Edward's Crown in gold and enamel. The watered silk ribbon is chartreuse yellow and formed into a bow. It is worn pinned to the dress of the recipient on the left shoulder.

It was provided in two different sizes: the largest version was bestowed on the Queen's mother and grandmother, and size two to the other recipients. (After the death of Queen Mary, Princess Margaret began wearing her grandmother's size 1 badge.) The size of the badges worn by both Diana, Princess of Wales, and the Duchess of Cornwall also match that on the size 1 badges.

List of known recipients
	
The initial badges were presented at Christmas 1952.

Deceased

Size 1:

 1952: Queen Elizabeth The Queen Mother (mother of Elizabeth II)
 1952: Queen Mary (grandmother of Elizabeth II)
 1952: Princess Margaret, Countess of Snowdon (younger sister of Elizabeth II)
 1981: Diana, Princess of Wales (daughter-in-law of Elizabeth II)

Size 2:

 1952: Mary, Princess Royal and Countess of Harewood (aunt of Elizabeth II)
 1952: Princess Alice, Duchess of Gloucester (aunt of Elizabeth II)
 1952: Princess Marina, Duchess of Kent (aunt of Elizabeth II)
 1952: Princess Alice, Countess of Athlone (great-aunt of Elizabeth II)

Living

 1952: Princess Alexandra, The Honourable Lady Ogilvy (first cousin of Elizabeth II)
 1961: Katharine, Duchess of Kent (wife of Elizabeth II's first cousin)
 1969: Anne, Princess Royal (daughter of Elizabeth II)
 1973: Birgitte, Duchess of Gloucester (wife of Elizabeth II's first cousin)
 2004: Sophie, Duchess of Edinburgh (daughter-in-law of Elizabeth II)
 2007: Queen Camilla (daughter-in-law of Elizabeth II)
 2017: Catherine, Princess of Wales (granddaughter-in-law of Elizabeth II)

Gallery

See also 
Royal family order
Royal Family Orders of the United Kingdom
 Royal Family Order of George IV
 Royal Order of Victoria and Albert
 Royal Family Order of Edward VII
 Royal Family Order of George V
 Royal Family Order of George VI

References

Royal family orders
Orders of chivalry of the United Kingdom
British royal family
Elizabeth II